Achish ( ʾāḵīš, Philistine: 𐤀𐤊𐤉𐤔 *ʾāḵayūš, Akkadian: 𒄿𒅗𒌑𒋢 i-ka-ú-su) is a name used in the Hebrew Bible for two Philistine rulers of Gath. It is perhaps only a general title of royalty, applicable to the Philistine kings. The two kings of Gath, which is identified by most scholars as Tell es-Safi, are:

 The monarch, described as "Achish the king of Gath", with whom David sought refuge when he fled from Saul. He is called Abimelech (meaning "father of the king") in the superscription of Psalm 34. It was probably this same king, or his son with the same name, described as "Achish, the son of Maoch", to whom David reappeared a second time at the head of a band of 600 warriors. The king assigned David to Ziklag, whence he carried on war against the surrounding tribes whilst lying to Achish that he was waging war against Israel to garner his support. Achish had great confidence in the valour and fidelity of David, but, at the objection of the other Philistine rulers, did not permit him to go to battle along with the Philistine hosts. David remained with Achish a year and four months. This led him to feign insanity in order to avoid harm from the King of Gath.
 Another king of Gath, described as "Achish, son of Maacah", probably a grandson of the foregoing king, is referred to during Solomon's reign. I Kings 2:39-46 mentions two servants of Shimei fleeing to this king in Gath, and Shimei going to Gath to bring them back, in breach of Solomon's orders, and the consequence was that Solomon put Shimei to death.

The Latin transliteration "Achish" represents the "Begadkefat" aspiration over a medial stop, in later Aramaic and post-Biblical Hebrew. Before the strong influence of this dialect of Aramaic over Hebrew, which occurred after the Babylonian invasion, אָכִישׁ would (if the vowels are right) have been pronounced "Akîsh".

In the seventh-century B.C. Ekron inscription the name "Akîsh" appears as "son of Padi, son of Ysd, son of Ada, son of Ya'ir"; Akîsh by then held enough authority in Ekron to dedicate a temple. A similar name ("Ikausu") appears as a king of Ekron in seventh-century B.C. Assyrian inscriptions, as does Padi. Scholars agree that these two are the same men, although a royal status cannot yet be confirmed for their ancestors Ysd, Ada, and Ya'ir.

This appears to indicate that either the name "Akish" was a common name for Philistine kings, used both at Gath and Ekron, or, as Naveh has suggested, that the editor of the biblical text used a known name of a Philistine king from the end of the Iron Age (Achish of Ekron) as the name of a king(s) of Gath in narratives relating to earlier periods.

Achish in film 
Achish king of Gath appears in the 1985 film King David, starring Richard Gere.

See also
Akish

References

Philistines
Philistine kings
Monarchs of the Hebrew Bible
Gath (city)